Elsa Amanda Linnér (born 14 February 2001) is a Swedish amateur golfer. In 2017 she won the European Girls' Team Championship, the Vagliano Trophy, the French International Lady Juniors Amateur Championship and the Annika Invitational Europe. In 2018 she won the European Ladies' Team Championship.

Career
Linnér joined the Swedish National Team in 2016 and represented her country at the European Girls' Team Championship, were Sweden was runner-up in 2016 and winner in 2017. She was part of the Swedish team winning the 2018 European Ladies' Team Championship, along with Linn Grant, Frida Kinhult, Sara Kjellker, Maja Stark and Beatrice Wallin.

She also excelled individually. In 2017 Linnér finished third at the Helen Holm Scottish Women's Open Championship, won the Annika Invitational Europe and the French International Lady Juniors Amateur Championship (Internationaux de France U21 - Tropee Esmond), and was runner-up at the Annika Invitational USA.

Linnér was a member of the 2017 European Junior Solheim Cup team and represented the Continent of Europe on the winning 2017 Vagliano Trophy team. In 2018 she was a member of the European Junior Ryder Cup team and represented Europe in the Patsy Hankins Trophy, held at the Doha Golf Club in Qatar.

She represented Sweden at the 2018 Summer Youth Olympics in Buenos Aires, Argentina.

In 2019 she won a professional tournament for the first time, the Lindbytvätten Masters on the Swedish Golf Tour.

Linnér started at Arizona State University as a mid-year addition in 2020, joining compatriot Linn Grant on the Arizona State Sun Devils golf team. She qualified for the 2021 U.S. Women's Open through the qualifier at Superstition Mountain.

Amateur wins
2013 Skandia Tour Regional #3
2015 Torslanda Junior Open, Skandia Cup (F14)
2016 Skandia Tour Elit #2
2017 French International Lady Juniors Amateur Championship, Annika Invitational Europe

Sources:

Professional wins (1)

Swedish Golf Tour wins (1)

Source:

Results in LPGA majors

CUT = missed the half-way cut
T = tied

Team appearances
Amateur
European Girls' Team Championship (representing Sweden): 2016, 2017 (winners)
European Ladies' Team Championship (representing Sweden): 2018 (winners)
Vagliano Trophy (representing the Continent of Europe): 2017 (winners)
Junior Solheim Cup (representing Europe): 2017
Junior Ryder Cup (representing Europe): 2018
Patsy Hankins Trophy (representing Europe): 2018
Summer Youth Olympics (representing Sweden): 2018

Source:

References

External links

Swedish female golfers
Amateur golfers
Arizona State Sun Devils women's golfers
Golfers at the 2018 Summer Youth Olympics
Sportspeople from Halland County
People from Kungsbacka
2001 births
Living people